"Just Around the Hill" is a song by German production group Sash!. It was released on 10 April 2000 as the second single from their third album, Trilenium (2000). It's the second Sash! song featuring British singer Tina Cousins. The song peaked at No. 8 on the UK Singles Chart. It was also a top-10 hit in Romania and peaked within the top 20 in Denmark and Finland.

Critical reception
Jon O'Brien from AllMusic noted that Tina Cousins "lends her sultry vocals" to the "gorgeous chillout" song. Pop Rescue commented, "...this sees the return of SASH!'s former collaborator, the brilliant Tina Cousins. This song is unlike anything else so far on this album – it's a pop ballad. Tina's vocals are beautiful, and she's surrounded by minimal bleeping and bubbling synths, and some synth strings. She's given loads of space to show off her rich vocals."

Track listing
German version

Credits
 Lyrics and music by R. Kappmeier, S. Lappessen, Thomas Alisson (tracks: T. Alisson) 
 Producer – Sash!, Tokapi  
 Vocals – Tina Cousins 
 Produced at Pink Elephant Studios 
 Published by Step By Step 
 Additional production: Track 4 – Doug Laurent, Track 5 – DJ Shah & Westböhm for SMP
℗ 2000 X-IT Records GmbH 0108585XIT
© 2000 edel records GmbH

Charts

Weekly charts

Year-end charts

References

External links
 Official website of Sash!
 Official website of Tina Cousins

2000 singles
2000 songs
Positiva Records singles
Sash! songs
Tina Cousins songs